Remy LaCroix is an American pornographic actress. She won the 2013 AVN Award for Best New Starlet and the 2014 AVN Award for Best Actress and the 2014 XRCO Award for Female Performer of the Year.

Early life 
Before entering the adult entertainment industry, LaCroix was a specialty dancer for several music festivals and Burning Man. Her performances included fire dancing, aerial silks and hula-hooping.

Career 
LaCroix entered the adult film industry in December 2011, with a gang bang scene for Kink.com, which was discussed in the James Franco produced documentary Kink. She worked for a period of six months before announcing that she was leaving porn. Citing burnout, she continued to honor previous commitments, worked for the talent department at Kink.com, and promoted her unreleased movies, eventually returning to shooting in November 2012.

In 2013, LA Weekly ranked her tenth on their list of ’10 Porn Stars Who Could Be the Next Jenna Jameson’. She was also placed on CNBC's yearly list ’The Dirty Dozen: Porn's Most Popular Stars’ in 2013 and 2014.

In December 2014, it was announced that Remy LaCroix was signed as a contract star with ArchAngel Productions, but less than three months into her contract she terminated her relationship with the production company.

In 2016, LaCroix was a judge on the web-based reality show The Sex Factor, which is a pornographic version of The X Factor.

She retired from professional shooting in 2016 due to pregnancy, but in 2020, she announced her return to the porn industry. Her comeback scene, for the Bellesa studio, was shot in July 2022 released in September 2022.

Awards 

 2013: AVN Award – Best New Starlet
 2013: AVN Award – Best Tease Performance – Remy (with Lexi Belle)
 2013: XBIZ Award – Best Actress - Couples-Themed Release – Torn
 2013: XRCO Award – Best New Starlet
 2013: Sex Award – Porn’s Perfect Girl/Girl Screen Couple (with Riley Reid)
 2014: AVN Award – Best Actress – The Temptation of Eve
 2014: AVN Award – Best Girl/Girl Sex Scene – Girl Fever (with Riley Reid)
 2014: AVN Award – Best Three-Way Sex Scene (Girl/Girl/Boy) – Remy 2 (with Riley Reid and Manuel Ferrara)
 2014: NightMoves Award – Best Female Performer (Editor's Choice)
 2014: XBIZ Award – Best Actress - Feature Movie – The Temptation of Eve
 2014: XRCO Award – Best Actress – The Temptation of Eve
 2014: XRCO Award – Female Performer of the Year
 2015: AVN Award – Best Girl/Girl Sex Scene – Gabi Gets Girls (with Gabriella Paltrova)
 2023: XBIZ Award – Best Sex Scene - Career-First Performance – Remy's Back With a Bang (with Dante Colle, Damon Dice, Tommy Pistol, and John Strong)

References

External links 
 
 
 

Year of birth missing (living people)
Actresses from San Francisco
American pornographic film actresses
Living people
Pornographic film actors from California
21st-century American women